Eight Deer Jaguar Claw, or 8 Deer for brevity, was a powerful Mixtec ruler in 11th-century Oaxaca referred to in the 15th-century deerskin manuscript Codex Zouche-Nuttall, and other Mixtec manuscripts. His surname is alternatively translated Tiger-Claw and Ocelot-Claw. John Pohl has dated his life spanning from 1063 until his sacrifice in 1115. Consonant with standard Mesoamerican practice, the "Eight Deer" component of his name refers to his day of birth within the 260-day Mesoamerican cycle, which cycles through 13 numbers and 20 various signs (e.g., animals, plants, natural phenomena).

Biography
Born on the Mixtec Calendar date from which he got his name, 8 Deer was the son of the high priest of Tilantongo 5 Crocodile "Sun of Rain". His mother was Lady 9 Eagle "Cocoa-Flower", queen of Tecamachalco. He also had two brothers, 12 Earthquake "Bloody Jaguar" and 9 Flower "Copalball with Arrow" who were both faithful war companions of 8 Deer.

He also had a half-sister, 6 Lizard "Jade-Fan". First the fiancée and lover of 8 Deer himself, she was finally married to 8 Deer's archenemy 11 Wind "Bloody Jaguar", the king of the city "Xipe's Bundle", also known as Red and White Bundle. The lords of Xipe's Bundle had rights to the throne of Tilantongo and were therefore the most important rivals to 8 Deer's power.

Lord 8 Deer is remembered for his military expansion. The Codex Zouche-Nuttall counts 94 cities conquered during his reign. Almost always pictured wearing a jaguar helmet, he supported the powerful Toltec ruler of Cholula, Lord 4 Jaguar "Face of the Night" in his attempts at expansionism, and was thus awarded a turquoise nose ornament, a symbol of Toltec royal authority.

The codices also tell of his several marriages which seem to have been part of a political strategy to achieve dominance by marrying into different Mixtec royal lineages. He married 13 Serpent, daughter of his own stepsister and former fiancée 6 Lizard.

In 1101 8 Deer finally conquered Xipe's Bundle, killed his wife's father and his stepsister's husband 11 Wind and tortured and killed his brothers-in-law, except the youngest one by the name of 4 Wind. In 1115 4 Wind led an alliance between different Mixtec kingdoms against 8 Deer who was taken prisoner and sacrificed by 4 Wind, his own nephew and brother-in-law.

Legacy
Eight Deer was the only Mixtec king ever to unite kingdoms of the three Mixtec areas: Tilantongo in the Mixteca Alta area with Teozacualco of the Mixteca Baja area and Tututepec of the coastal Mixteca area.

His reputation as a great ruler has given him a legendary status among the Mixtecs; some aspects of his life story as it is told in the pictographic codices seem to merge with myth. Furthermore, actual knowledge of his life is hindered by the lack of complete understanding of the Mixtec codices, and although the study of the codices has advanced much over the past 20 years, it is still difficult to achieve a definitive interpretation of their narrative. The narrative, as it is currently understood, is a tragic story of a man who achieves greatness but falls victim to his own hunger for power. The above biography of 8 Deer is based on the codex's interpretation by Mixtec specialist John Pohl.

Notes

References
 
 
 

 
 
 
 

1115 deaths
Mixtec people
1063 births
Medieval kings
Indigenous military personnel of the Americas
Executed military leaders
Executed monarchs
11th-century monarchs in North America